†Viviparus glacialis is an extinct species of fossil freshwater snail, an aquatic gastropod mollusks in the family Viviparidae, the river snails.

Shell description
This species of snail had an elongated, slim, rather thick-walled shell with approximately 6 ¼ flat whorls which are separated by a shallow suture. The apex is blunt. The aperture is slantingly oval and weakly angulated at the top. The peristome is simple, not thickened and not continuous. There is a narrow umbilicus that may be covered with callus. The surface of the shell is smooth and glossy and bears regular growing lines. Under a magnification of c. 50× a sculpture of fine spiral grooves can be observed. These 'grooves' are composed of densely spaced tiny holes. In most cases the periostracum has not been preserved but if still present this has a light brown to black color. Whether or not the shell had a color pattern, and if so what that might have been is unknown.

The width of the shell is up to 13.5 mm, the height is up to 24 mm.

Distribution 
The species is only known from the Netherlands and the United Kingdom. From the United Kingdom only 6 specimens are known (among which is the holotype). The specimens have been found in the Weybourn Crag, which has an estuarine facies. In the Netherlands the species has been only found in deposits of the River Rhine. It is known from clay pits in the surroundings of the village of Tegelen (Province of Limburg) and in several dozens of boreholes, especially in the Southern part of the Netherlands. The species may occasionally occur there in very high numbers.

Fossil occurrence
In the Netherlands known from interglacial deposits with a Tiglian and Pretiglian age. In the United Kingdom only present in the late Tiglian.

As an index fossil
Viviparus glacialis is, although already present in the Pretiglian, considered as a guide fossil or index fossil for the Tiglian.

Ecology

Reproduction and life span
Although all Viviparidae are ovoviviparous, nothing is known about the reproduction strategy of this species. Based upon counting of the annual growth rings within the shell, this species may reach an age of at least 12 years.

Habitat
According to the ecological preferences of extant species co-occurring with Viviparus glacialis and the sedimentary facies in which these are found, the species favours quiet parts of a fluvial environment. From the same data it may be concluded that the species can endure a slight increase of salinity.

References

Further reading
  , 1991. Early and Early Middle Pleistocene correlations in the southern North Sea Basin. Quaternary Science Reviews 10: 23–52.
  , 1990a. Notes on Quaternary freshwater mollusca of the Netherlands, with descriptions of some new species. Mededelingen van de Werkgroep voor Tertiaire en Kwartaire Geologie, 26(1989): 145–181.

Viviparidae
Pleistocene gastropods
Gastropods described in 1872